The discography of Bloc Party, a British indie rock band, consists of six studio albums, three extended plays (EPs), and two remix albums released on primary label Wichita Recordings. Bloc Party were formed in 1999 by chief songwriter and frontman Kele Okereke (vocals, rhythm guitar) and Russell Lissack (lead guitar). Bassist Gordon Moakes and drummer Matt Tong joined the band later. The first song by them that we know of is called “This Is Not A Competition” although it hasn't been officially released, it was the first song the band put on their official website. The quartet's first release was the Bloc Party EP in 2004; the first single, "She's Hearing Voices", was released and it failed to chart in the United Kingdom. The next EP, Little Thoughts was released the same year only in  Japan; it included Bloc Party's first UK Top 40 entry, the double A-side "Little Thoughts/Tulips", which peaked at number 38.

Bloc Party's first studio album, Silent Alarm was released in 2005 and was the band's UK breakthrough by reaching number three on the UK Albums Chart. The album generated a hit single, "So Here We Are/Positive Tension", which peaked at number five on the UK Top 40. In late 2005, Silent Alarm was nominated for the Mercury Music Prize and was voted as the NME Album of the Year. After two years, during which their songs appeared on several compilations, the band members released A Weekend in the City in 2007. The record entered the UK Albums Chart at number two and debuted in the United States at number 12. The first single from the album, "The Prayer", peaked at number four on the UK Top 40 and is the quartet's highest charting UK song to date.

In 2008, Bloc Party released their third studio album, Intimacy, which reached a peak of number eight in the UK and entered the Billboard 200 in the US at number 18. The highest-charting single from the record was "Mercury", which peaked at number 16 on the UK Top 40. As of 2009, Bloc Party have sold more than three million album copies in their career. The band released Four, their fourth studio album, in 2012 through Frenchkiss Records. It was their first album following a prolonged hiatus for the band, during which several members of the band were involved in side projects. Four was produced by Alex Newport (The Mars Volta, At the Drive-In, and Polysics), and the album was recorded and mixed in New York City.

The band's fifth studio album, Hymns, was released in January 2016. It entered the UK Albums Chart at number 12. Though three singles were officially released from the album, none entered a singles chart.

Bloc Party's sixth studio album, Alpha Games was released on 22 April 2022.

Albums

Studio albums

Live albums 
 Silent Alarm Live (2019)

Remix albums

Extended plays

Singles 

Notes

Other charted songs

Other appearances 
Listed are songs that were not released by Bloc Party as stand-alone singles, but which were included in third-party formats.

Music videos

References

External links
 Bloc Party releases at Bloc Party official website

Discography
Rock music group discographies
Discographies of British artists